Ann Stone Minot (April 25, 1894 – 1980) was an American biochemist and physiologist.

She was born in Woodsville, New Hampshire, the oldest of six children born to Jonas Minot and Sybil Buck. For their early education, Minot and her siblings attended the Bath Village School, a small three-room schoolhouse. Starting in 1911, Minot matriculated to Smith College with the help of a partial scholarship, where she majored in chemistry and English. She graduated in 1915 with an A.B. degree.

Her first full-time job was as a teacher at Woodsville High School. She was soon hired as a lab assistant at Massachusetts General Hospital, where she remained for five years, acquiring an interest in biochemical and physiological clinical studies. During this period she published eighteen scientific papers, and worked with the biochemical pioneer Willey Denis starting in 1917. In 1920 she returned to school for graduate studies at Radcliffe College, which then functioned as the all-female branch of Harvard College. She investigated lead poisoning for her doctorate, and was awarded a Ph.D. in 1925 with a thesis titled, "Distribution of Lead in the Organism in Acute and Chronic Lead Poisoning".

Following graduation, in 1926 Minot was hired by Dr. Paul D. Lamson as a research associate in the department of pharmacology at Vanderbilt University in Tennessee for a $2,500 annual salary. In 1930 she became an assistant professor of pediatric research at Vanderbilt, investigating the effects of hormones on bone growth and studying fluid balance in infant diarrhea. Her studies led her to an interest in progressive muscle diseases, including myasthenia gravis and muscular dystrophy. In 1938, she became the first to apply guanidine to treat myasthenia gravis. Other topics of research include protein deficiency, Vitamin C deficiency, and tocopherol. She established the Vanderbilt Hospital blood bank in 1940, and it was made her responsibility until 1949 when it was taken over by the Red Cross.

Minot was named associate professor in biochemistry at Vanderbilt in 1943. She remained in pediatric research until 1946, when she became Director of the Clinical Chemistry Lab. In 1948, she was elected to alumni membership of Phi Beta Kappa, Zeta Chapter, for her bone treatment method. Minot was raised to full professorship in 1950, and remained so until 1960 when she retired and was named professor emeritus. She continued as a research associate in endocrinology until finally giving up her research pursuits in 1969 at the age of 75. In total, she published 70 scientific papers.

Bibliography

References

1894 births
1980 deaths
People from Woodsville, New Hampshire
Smith College alumni
Radcliffe College alumni
Vanderbilt University faculty
American biochemists
American physiologists
Women physiologists
American medical researchers